Mount Martyn is a cluster of bare rock faces with one peak, standing  south of Eld Peak in the Lazarev Mountains of Antarctica. This is probably the most prominent rock outcrop on the west side of Matusevich Glacier. The mountain was photographed by U.S. Navy Operation Highjump, 1946–47, and again on February 20, 1959, by the Australian National Antarctic Research Expeditions (ANARE) (Magga Dan) led by Phillip Law. It was named for D.F. Martyn, a member of the ANARE Executive Planning Committee.

References

Mountains of Oates Land